Rosenberg is a quarter in the district 5 of Winterthur, Switzerland.

It was formerly a part of Veltheim municipality, which was incorporated into Winterthur in 1922.

Winterthur